(born 3 January 1979 in Rome) is an Italian celebrity chef, actor, foreign tarento, social media personality, businessman, martial artist and sommelier dell'Olio. He holds the rank of 3rd dan black belt in Kyokushin karate. He is the president of the Italian Cooking Association in Japan, known as "Italian Ryouri Kenkyukai" in Japanese. In a survey he was found to be the second most famous Italian in Japan after Giorgio Armani.

Bellissimo writes for various Japanese cooking magazines and books.

Early life
Born in Rome on 3 January 1979, Bellissimo took an early interest in cooking through his parents. Graduated from the Alessandro Caravillani Art school of Rome. During his time at Sapienza University of Rome, where he majored in Philosophy, he entered the army and graduated from school there. In 2001, he came to Japan and graduated from a Japanese language class at the YMCA. He has won first place at a Japanese debate contest.

Career
Aside from his work as a chef and a foreign tarento, Bellissimo has experience as a food critic, an Italian cuisine consultant, a motivational speaker, a model for fashion magazines, a columnist, an essayist, and a sports commentator. 
He is also known to be quite knowledgeable on Italian fashion, and is often referred to as "one of the trendiest chefs in the industry".

Ambassador of the history of Italian cuisine
In 2017, Bellissimo has launched a cultural program on the cuisine of Leonardo da Vinci and Ancient Rome together with historian Daniele Macuglia from Peking University. With Macuglia, he reconstructs forgotten dishes of the Italian culture and lectured at various universities and cultural institutes in the  United States, European Union and Japan.

Filmography

Appearances in Television Variety Programs
 Handsome Kitchen (Fuji Television)
 Waratte Iitomo! (Fuji Television)
 Wagamama!Kimama!Tabikibun (BS-Fuji)
 GakkoChakkoTV (Akita Television)
 Konnichiwa Itto6ken (NHK)
 Kitchen ga hashiru! (NHK)
 One Seg Lunch Box Raku Gohan (NHK)
 Junbanmachi no Ryorikyoshitsu (LaLa TV)
 Sekai ga Odorita Nippon!Sugoi desune!!Shisatsudan (TV Asahi)
 Uchigohan (TV Asahi)
 Eko no Saho (TV Asahi)
 Shikamo!! (Nippon Television)
 Sekai banzuke (Nippon Television)
 Osama no brunch (Tokyo Broadcasting System)
 Sekai fushigi hakken! (Tokyo Broadcasting System)
 Sekai no minna ni kiitemita (Tokyo Broadcasting System)
 Sekai kurabetemitara (Tokyo Broadcasting System)
 Bara iro Dandi (Tokyo MX)
 Goji ni Muchu(Tokyo MX)

Appearances in Television Dramas
 Kyō wa Kaisha Yasumimasu. (2014).... Italian Chef
 Kore wa Keihi de Ochimasen! (2019).... Italian Chef
 Le avventure del Comandante Cappellini - Sensuikan Cappellini-go no Boken (2022).... Simone

Appearances in Live Sports Broadcasting
 Blaublitz Akita matches (Akita Television)

Appearances in Commercials
 Suits for AEON's Top Value line (March–May 2014)
 Italian suits for AEON's Top Value line (September–November 2014)
 Setagaya Shizensyokuhin (December 2018 – )
 Croquette no Manma for Mikakuto Co.,Ltd (October 2019 – December 2019)

Bibliography

Magazine Appearances
 Forbes Japan (link-ties)
 Shukan Shincho (Shinchosha)
 Cosmopolitan (Hearst Communications)
 Shuukan Shinchou (Shinchosha)
 "Nutrition and Cooking" (Kagawa Nutrition University)
 AMARENA (Fusosha Publishing)
 ESSE (Fusosha Publishing)
 SPA! (Fusosha Publishing)
 "ASCII Weekly" (ASCII Media Works)
 CanCam (Shogakukan)
 PRECIOUS (Shogakukan)
 Jyosei Seven (Shogakukan)
 BIteki (Shogakukan)
 S Cawaii! (SHUFUNOTOMO)
 Akachan Ga Hoshii (SHUFUNOTOMO)
Among others

Awards and nominations

Sky PerfecTV! Awards

References

External links 
  (Japanese)
 
 Francesco Bellissimo Profile on Shimashow (English)
 HIGHTFLYERS - BICULTURAL SOULS, Interview with Francesco Bellissimo (Japanese)

Businesspeople from Rome
Expatriate television personalities in Japan
Italian expatriates in Japan
Italian chefs
Italian television chefs
Japanese television chefs
1979 births
Living people
Kyokushin kaikan practitioners
Italian people of Japanese descent
Male actors from Rome
People of Calabrian descent
21st-century Italian male actors
Italian male television actors